Jang Bo-ri Is Here! is a 2014 South Korean weekend television drama series broadcast by MBC starring Oh Yeon-seo, Kim Ji-hoon, Lee Yu-ri and Oh Chang-seok. It premiered on April 5, 2014, airing every Saturday and Sunday at 20:40 for 52 episodes.     
It won Drama of the Year at the 2014 MBC Drama Awards.

Synopsis

The events center around a renowned Hanbok-making house called Bi Sool Chae. The Master Artisan of Bi Sool Chae, Kim Soo-Mi, focuses on preserving the traditions of Hanbok-making, including hand-dyeing and hand-sewing each garment.

The Master Artisan lives with her two married sons in her traditional Korean estate. Her two daughters-in-law have been her apprentices for a long time. When the time comes for the Artisan to choose her successor, the fierce competition between the two daughters-in-law results in tragedies that reverberate for decades afterwards.

Cast

Main characters 
Oh Yeon-seo as Jang Bo-ri/Jang Eun-bi
Yoo Eun-mi as young Bo-ri
Kim Ji-hoon as Lee Jae-hwa
Jung Yoon-seok as young Jae-hwa
Lee Yu-ri as Yeon Min-jung
Shin Soo-yeon as young Min-jung
Oh Chang-seok as Lee Jae-hee
Jo Hyun-do as young Jae-hee

Supporting characters 
Kim Yong-rim as Park Soo-mi
Kim Hye-ok as In-hwa
Yang Mi-kyung as Song Ok-soo
Ahn Nae-sang as Jang Soo-bong
Han Jin-hee as Lee Dong-hoo
Geum Bo-ra as Lee Hwa-yeon
Woo Hee-jin as Lee Jung-ran
Han Seung-yeon as Lee Ga-eul
Jang Won-jong as Jang Hee-bong (cameo)
Hwang Young-hee as Do Hye-ok
Park Geon-il as Kang Yoo-chun
Choi Dae-chul as Kang Nae-chun
Jeon In-chul as Park Jong-ha
Kim Ji-young as Do Bi-dan
Sung Hyuk as Moon Ji-sang
Oh Seung-ah as Choi Yoo Ra
Lee Dong-ha as Hyeon-chae

Awards and nominations

See also
List of South Korean dramas

References

External links
Jang Bo-ri Is Here! official MBC website 

 Jang Bo-ri Is Here! at Jidam Inc.

MBC TV television dramas
2014 South Korean television series debuts
Korean-language television shows
2014 South Korean television series endings
South Korean romance television series
South Korean comedy television series
Television shows written by Kim Soon-ok